Shatby is a neighborhood in Alexandria, Egypt.

Institutions
Many important institutes are located in Shatby, such as: 
Alexandria University
Bibliotheca Alexandrina
Collège Saint Marc
El Nasr Boys' School
El Nasr Girls' College
Lycée Français d'Alexandrie (Lycée Al-Horreya)
Shatby Pediatric Hospital
Al Ittihad Alexandria Club

Cemetery and war memorial
The main Alexandria cemetery complex is in Shatby. It was designed by Sir Robert Lorimer in 1919. It includes the Alexandria Military and War Memorial Cemetery, a Commonwealth War Cemetery that includes the graves of British and Empire service personnel who died in the First and Second World Wars. 2,259 are from the First World War and 503 are from the Second World War.

Also in the military cemetery is the Shatby Memorial, which commemorates 986 United Kingdom and British Empire service personnel who died at sea in the Mediterranean in the First World War and have no grave on land.

Commonwealth war graves are also to be found in: 
Shatby Jewish Cemetery Number 3, where are buried 20 service personnel of World War I (of whom 19 are in one plot) and two of World War II, besides a memorial to fallen men of the Zion Mule Corps.

Tombs of El Shatby (El Shatby Necropolis)

Location 
These tombs are situated at the north of Collège Saint Marc from the seaside, in the city of Alexandria east of Selsela area (ancient Lochias). The tombs were discovered by chance in 1893 and 1904 by chance by Giuseppe Botti and Evaristo Breccia.

History 
The tombs are considered to be the most ancient tombs in Alexandria as it dates back to 320 B.C. As for Evaristo Breccia (The second director of the Graeco-Roman Museum in Alexandria) it dates back to the last quarter of the 4th Century and the beginning of the 3rd century B.C. immediately after founding the city of Alexandria by Alexander The Great.

See also
 Neighborhoods in Alexandria

References

External links

 Alexandria Egypt Tourism

 Egy Monuments/

 Bibliotheca Alexandrina

Neighbourhoods of Alexandria